Belvedere is a 2010 Bosnian drama film, directed by Ahmed Imamović. The film was selected as the Bosnian entry for the Best Foreign Language Film at the 84th Academy Awards, but it did not make the final shortlist.

Cast
Sadžida Šetić - Ruvejda
Nermin Tulić - Alija
Minka Muftić - Zejna

See also
List of submissions to the 84th Academy Awards for Best Foreign Language Film
List of Bosnian submissions for the Academy Award for Best Foreign Language Film

References

External links

2010 films
Bosnian-language films
2010 drama films
Bosnia and Herzegovina drama films